Brush Prairie is a census-designated place (CDP) in Clark County, Washington, United States. The population was 2,652 at the 2010 census, up from 2,384 at the 2000 census.

Based on per capita income, one of the more reliable measures of affluence, Brush Prairie ranks 57th of 522 areas in the state of Washington to be ranked.

Geography
Brush Prairie is located southwest of the center of Clark County at  (45.728934, -122.542143). It is bordered by Meadow Glade and Battle Ground to the north, Hockinson to the east, Orchards and Five Corners to the south, and Barberton to the west. Washington State Route 503 passes through the community, leading north  to the center of Battle Ground and south  to the start of the SR 500 freeway at the northern border of Vancouver.

History 
A post office called Brush Prairie has been in operation since 1871. The community was named by Elmarine Jane Bowman for a brushy prairie and swamp on her father's homestead.

Demographics
As of the census of 2000, there were 2,384 people, 868 households, and 671 families residing in the CDP. The population density was 304.8 people per square mile (117.7/km2). There were 902 housing units at an average density of 115.3/sq mi (44.5/km2). The racial makeup of the CDP was 96.14% White, 0.21% African American, 0.29% Native American, 0.71% Asian, 0.21% Pacific Islander, 0.59% from other races, and 1.85% from two or more races. Hispanic or Latino of any race were 1.68% of the population. 21.0% were of German, 8.9% United States or American, 8.7% Irish, 8.4% Norwegian, 6.8% English and 6.7% French ancestry according to Census 2000. 97.5% spoke English and 2.5% Spanish as their first language.

There were 868 households, out of which 32.1% had children under the age of 18 living with them, 68.3% were married couples living together, 6.6% had a female householder with no husband present, and 22.6% were non-families. 18.4% of all households were made up of individuals, and 7.3% had someone living alone who was 65 years of age or older. The average household size was 2.74 and the average family size was 3.11.

In the CDP, the age distribution of the population shows 26.6% under the age of 18, 6.5% from 18 to 24, 24.0% from 25 to 44, 31.8% from 45 to 64, and 11.0% who were 65 years of age or older. The median age was 41 years. For every 100 females, there were 98.3 males. For every 100 females age 18 and over, there were 96.9 males.

The median income for a household in the CDP was $59,408, and the median income for a family was $71,793. Males had a median income of $47,708 versus $40,533 for females. The per capita income for the CDP was $27,605. About 2.4% of families and 3.9% of the population were below the poverty line, including 5.0% of those under age 18 and 6.2% of those age 65 or over.

Notable people
 Dan Dickau, former NBA basketball player
 Gary Gray, actor
 Zia McCabe, keyboardist for the rock band The Dandy Warhols
 Richie Sexson, Major League Baseball first baseman
 Gerry Staley, Major League Baseball pitcher

References

External links
 Brush Prairie Business
 Brush Prairie Wildlife Botanical Gardens

Census-designated places in Clark County, Washington
Portland metropolitan area
Census-designated places in Washington (state)